John Howard Richardson (May 25, 1945 in Minneapolis, Minnesota) is a former professional American football player who played defensive tackle for seven seasons for the Miami Dolphins and the St. Louis Cardinals John was a graduate of Kearny High School (San Diego, California). He was a member of the 1966 College Football All-America Team.

References

1945 births
Living people
Players of American football from Minneapolis
American football defensive tackles
UCLA Bruins football players
Miami Dolphins players
St. Louis Cardinals (football) players
American Football League players
Kearny High School (California) alumni